Svein Oddvar Moen (born 22 January 1979) is a Norwegian football referee. He took up refereeing in 1995, and made his debut in the Eliteserien in 2003. He represents SK Haugar.

Career
He was selected to officiate the final of the 2011 FIFA U-17 World Cup on 10 July 2011.

Moen was in charge of the UEFA Champions League quarter final between Bayern Munich and Olympique de Marseille in 2012. He was also in charge of UEFA Champions League second round first leg between Bayern Munich and Arsenal on 19 February 2013 at the Emirates Stadium. He was also in charge of UEFA Champions League quarter final first leg between Real Madrid and Galatasaray on 3 April 2013 at the Santiago Bernabéu Stadium.

On 7 June 2013, he sent off Mario Balotelli in a World Cup qualifying game between Czech Republic and Italy.

He officiated in the Euro 2016 qualifier Germany v Scotland on 7 September 2014.

References

1979 births
Living people
Norwegian football referees
UEFA Champions League referees
UEFA Europa League referees
Olympic football referees
Football referees at the 2012 Summer Olympics
People from Haugesund
Kniksen Award winners
UEFA Euro 2016 referees